Orange cuttlefish or orange squid is the most common English name used for the cuttlefish dish in Cantonese cuisine.  It is a siu mei although it is not quite roasted. The dish is most commonly found in Southern China, Hong Kong and overseas Chinatowns.

Names
A cuttlefish or squid can be used interchangeably, though they both share the same Chinese food name.  It is also shortened most of the time to just.

The word "orange" has been used to distinguish it by color.  The fruit orange does not have anything to do with the dish.

Cantonese cuisine
The orange color comes from food coloring dye. Some flavors are added in order to enhance the taste of the cuttlefish.  It has a unique soft-crisp texture, generally not found in any other meat.

When served, it is usually sliced into tiny pieces.  It comes with a black soy sauce-based dipping gravy called that gives it a mildly salty flavor.  The sauce is culturally accepted to originate in Guangdong or Chaozhou cuisine.

See also
 Dried shredded squid
 List of seafood dishes

References

Cantonese cuisine
Hong Kong cuisine
Seafood dishes